Marte Reenaas (born 20 January 1979) is a Norwegian ski-orienteering competitor and world champion. She won a gold medal in the relay event at the World Ski Orienteering Championships in Levi in 2005, together with Kjersti Reenaas and Stine Hjermstad Kirkevik. She received a bronze medal in the long distance in Moscow in 2007.

References

1979 births
Living people
Norwegian orienteers
Female orienteers
Ski-orienteers
21st-century Norwegian women